Carole Calmes (born 10 September 1978) is a Luxembourgian sports shooter. She competed in the Women's 10 metre air rifle event at the 2012 Summer Olympics.

References

External links
 

1978 births
Living people
Luxembourgian female sport shooters
Olympic shooters of Luxembourg
Shooters at the 2012 Summer Olympics
Sportspeople from Luxembourg City
European Games competitors for Luxembourg
Shooters at the 2015 European Games